Indian Field is a census-designated place (CDP) in the town of Greenwich, Fairfield County, Connecticut, United States. It is in the southern part of the town, on a peninsula between Indian Harbor to the west and Cos Cob Harbor to the east. It extends south into Captain Harbor, an inlet of Long Island Sound, and it extends north as far as U.S. Route 1 (East Putnam Avenue). Interstate 95 crosses the CDP, with access from Exit 4 (Indian Field Road).

Indian Field was first listed as a CDP prior to the 2020 census.

References 

Census-designated places in Fairfield County, Connecticut
Census-designated places in Connecticut